Brunner may refer to:

Places
 Brunner, New Zealand
 Lake Brunner, New Zealand
 Brunner Mine, New Zealand
 Brunner, Houston, United States
 Brunner (crater), lunar crater

Other uses
 Brunner (surname)
 Brunner the Bounty Hunter, a character from the Warhammer setting

See also
Brunner's glands, part of the digestive system
Yul Brynner (1915–1985), Russian-born film and stage actor
Brenner (disambiguation)
Bruner, a surname
Bruener (disambiguation)